The 75th World Science Fiction Convention (Worldcon), also known as Worldcon 75, was held on 9–13 August 2017 at the Helsinki Exhibition and Convention Centre in Helsinki, Finland.

The convention chair was Jukka Halme, and the vice-chairs were Karo Leikomaa and Colette H. Fozard.

Participants 

Attendance was 7,949, out of 10,616 paid memberships and day passes.

Guests of Honor 

 Swedish author and translator John-Henri Holmberg
 Jamaican author Nalo Hopkinson
 Finnish author Johanna Sinisalo
 French artist and illustrator Claire Wendling (absent due to illness)
 American author Walter Jon Williams

Awards

2017 Hugo Awards 

 Best Novel: The Obelisk Gate by N. K. Jemisin
 Best Novella: "Every Heart a Doorway" by Seanan McGuire
 Best Novelette: "The Tomato Thief" by Ursula Vernon
 Best Short Story: "Seasons of Glass and Iron" by Amal El-Mohtar
 Best Related Work: Words Are My Matter: Writings About Life and Books by Ursula K. Le Guin
 Best Graphic Story: Monstress, Volume 1, written by Marjorie Liu, art by Sana Takeda, colors by ?
 Best Dramatic Presentation, Short Form: The Expanse, "Leviathan Wakes", screenplay by Mark Fergus & Hawk Ostby, directed by Terry McDonough
 Best Professional Editor, Long Form: Liz Gorinsky
 Best Professional Editor, Short Form: Ellen Datlow
 Best Professional Artist: Julie Dillon
 Best Semiprozine: Uncanny Magazine, edited by Lynne M. Thomas and Michael Damian Thomas
 Best Fancast: Tea and Jeopardy, edited by Emma Newman and Peter Newman
 Best Fanzine: Lady Business, edited by ?
 Best Fan Writer: Abigail Nussbaum
 Best Fan Artist: Elizabeth Leggett

Other awards 

 John W. Campbell Award for Best New Writer: Ada Palmer
 Atorox Award: Maiju Ihalainen
 Seiun Award: Yasumi Kobayashi (novel)
 Big Heart Award: Carolina Gómez Lagerlöf

Site selection 

The location was selected in August 2015 by the members of the 73rd World Science Fiction Convention (Sasquan) in Spokane, Washington.

The following committees announced bids to host the 75th World Science Fiction Convention and filed all of the required paperwork before the February 2015 filing deadline:
 DC-17, to be held at the Marriott Wardman Park in Washington, D.C., on 16–20 August 2017. The bid co-chairs were Michael Nelson and Warren Buff.
 Helsinki in 2017, to be held at the Helsinki Exhibition and Convention Centre in Helsinki, Finland, on 9–13 August 2017. The bid chair was Eemeli Aro.
 Montréal in 2017, to be held at the Palais des congrès de Montréal in Montréal, Québec, Canada, on 31 August–4 September 2017. The bid chair was Jannie Shea.
 Nippon in 2017, to be held at the Shizuoka Convention & Arts Center in Shizuoka, Japan, on 23–27 August 2017. The bid chair was Hideaki Kawai.

A bid for New York City in 2017 was floated for several years but dropped before reaching the commitment stage. The Montréal bid was originally announced for 2019 but shifted to the earlier date in 2013.

The 2017 site selected by the voters was announced during Sasquan's third World Science Fiction Society business meeting, on Saturday, 22 August 2015. With 1363 votes out of 2625 valid ballots, Helsinki won on the first ballot and will operate as "Worldcon 75". DC17 ran second with 878 votes. Montréal third with 228, and Nippon fourth with 120. Sites receiving write-in votes included Night Vale, Minneapolis in '73. Gallifrey, and All of the Above.

See also 

 Hugo Award
 Science fiction
 Speculative fiction
 World Science Fiction Society
 Worldcon

References

External links 

 
 

2010s in Helsinki
2017 conferences
2017 in Finland
August 2017 events in Europe
Entertainment events in Finland
Science fiction conventions in Europe
Worldcon